Fred Vincent Smith (July 29, 1891 in Cleveland, Ohio – May 28, 1961 in Cleveland, Ohio) was an infielder in Major League Baseball in the early 20th century.  Smith played his first game on April 17, 1913, and played his final game on September 30, 1917. He was later the manager of the Hattiesburg, Mississippi minor league team during the 1923 season.

Smith's pro career began with three seasons for the minor league Peoria Distillers. His best season in the majors came in 1915, with 122 hits and a batting average of .244.

Fred's brother Charlie Smith was a pitcher for four MLB teams, winning 66 games.

Sources
, or Retrosheet

1891 births
1961 deaths
Atlanta Crackers players
Baseball players from Cleveland
Boston Braves players
Brooklyn Tip-Tops players
Buffalo Blues players
Buffalo Buffeds players
Major League Baseball third basemen
Minor league baseball managers
Moline Plowboys players
Peoria Distillers players
St. Louis Cardinals players
St. Paul Saints (AA) players